Copadichromis mloto is a species of haplochromine cichlid which is endemic to Lake Malawi.

References

Fish of Malawi
mloto
Fish described in 1960
Taxonomy articles created by Polbot
Fish of Lake Malawi